The Wabern–Brilon Wald railway is a 86.7 kilometre-long, single-track, partially disused secondary railway line from Wabern in North Hesse to Brilon-Wald in North Rhine-Westphalia.
 
The disused middle section from Bad Wildungen to Korbach is called the Ederseebahn (Eder Railway) after the nearby Edersee (Lake Eder), while the section between Korbach and Brilon Wald is called the Uplandbahn (Upland Railway) after the Upland range.

Route

Wabern–Bad Wildungen section
The line towards Korbach initially runs upstream in the valley of the Eder through the Schwalm-Eder district from Wabern, where there is a connection to the Main-Weser Railway, to Zennern, after which it crosses Autobahn 49, and continues along federal road 253 via Fritzlar and through the Porta Hassiaca (Hessian Gate) via Ungedanken and Mandern to Wega. The line from Mandern to Willingen passes through the Waldeck-Frankenberg district.
 
The line continues from the Wega triangular juncture along federal road 253 through the valley of Wilde to the terminal station at Bad Wildungen. Freight trains on the Wabern–Korbach route were able to bypass Bad Wildungen, using a connecting curve in Wega.

Edersee Railway—Bad Wildungen–Bergheim section 
From Bad Wildungen, trains on the line, now known as the Ederseebahn (Edersee Railway), reverse to return to the Wega triangular juncture. From there, the line, which was closed in May 1995, runs towards Korbach. First it runs through the Wega Tunnel directly west of Wega, piercing a wooded spur, and then continues up the Eder valley via Anraff and Giflitz (Bergheim-Giflitz station) to Bergheim.

E.ON connecting line (Bergheim–Hemfurth) 

 
While the main line continues towards Korbach, the decommissioned E.ON connecting line ran from Bergheim through the Eder valley and along the Affolderner See reservoir to the Waldeck Pumped Storage Station near Hemfurth, a district of Hemfurth-Edersee. There it crossed the Eder to end at a terminal station near the valley station of the Peterskopfbahn funicular railway. A little to the north of it is the Edersee dam.
 
In 2006, a Draisine line was established on an approximately two-kilometre section between  Affoldern and Hemfurth. A new stop with a 20-metre-long platform was built in its support in Affoldern at the Edersee Info-Point. The line ends directly in front of the Eder Bridge near Hemfurth. It was originally planned to extend the line to Hemfurth station, but this could not be carried out because the Eder Bridge is also used by road vehicles.

Edersee Railway—Bergheim–Korbach section 
 
 
Before Bergheim, the Edersee Railway crosses from the southern to the northern bank of the Eder and then climbs up the valley of the Netze next to  federal road 485. It crosses the valleys of some stream, which required some complex bridge structures to be built. It runs to the Mehlen district of Lieschensruh, which has no station, over the 30 metre-high Buhlen Viaduct, which spans both the Netze and federal road 485, after which it runs through Buhlen and Waldeck-Ost to Netze. Waldeck station was the hub of operations on the line, which until its closure was a rustic branch line.
 

 
The course of the line then runs westwards over Selbach Viaduct, which spans the Reiherbach valley near Selbach. The line then ran via Sachsenhausen, after which it passed through Sachsenhausen Tunnel under federal road 485, then continued north to Höringhausen. There it made an uneven, elongated 180° turn, and then ran to the west across the Werbe again on a high embankment.
 
The line passes through Meineringhausen and Meineringhäusen Tunnel, passing under federal road 251, and a little later it crosses the Am Melm track while running next to route 251. It reaches Korbach, where the line again passes over a bridge over federal road 251, which forms Korbach's south ring. There is a connection to the Warburg–Sarnau railway at Korbach Hauptbahnhof, where the disused Edersee Railway ends.

Upland Railway—Korbach–Usseln section 

Beyond Korbach (384 m above sea level) the Uplandbahn (Upland Railway), which is still in operation, runs slightly north-west along federal road 251 and climbs significantly until shortly after Usseln (580 to 620 m). First it passes through Lelbach to the now closed Lelbach-Rhena station, after which it runs to the north of Rhena. Here it crosses a small tributary of the Rhena in the catchment area of the Neerdar on the Rhena Viaduct (Rhenaer Viadukt).
 
This is followed by Bömighausen station north of Bömighausen and then Bömighäusen Viaduct (Bömighäuser Viadukt), which crosses a small stream in the Neerdar catchment area. The line reaches Neerdar station to the north of Neerdar.
 
Passing Eimelrod station to the south of Eimelrod, the railway line runs to Usseln after bridging federal road 251 again, where it crosses the Diemel on the Usseln Viaduct (Usselner Viadukt). All stations between Korbach and Usseln are now out of use.

Upland Railway—Usseln–Brilon Wald section 

The last part through the Upland is downhill. After Usseln, the line reaches Stryck station, northeast of Stryck, after again crossing under federal road 251, where trains only stop when ski jumping events are held at the Mühlenkopfschanze. The line now turns to the northeast and crosses the Itter on the Willingen Viaduct (Willinger Viadukt) to reach Willingen.
 
Beyond Willingen it runs to the north in the valley of the Hoppecke, where it crosses the state border with North Rhine-Westphalia and the Hochsauerland district, towards Brilon-Wald. There is a connection to the Upper Ruhr Valley Railway, which connects Hagen with Warburg. The Wabern–Brilon Wald railway ends there. There is another connection to the Alme Valley Railway, which was restored for passenger traffic as far as Brilon Stadt in December 2011. A large proportion of the trains from Korbach terminate at Brilon Stadt.

History

 
The line was opened in several sections:
 
 Wabern–Bad-Wildungen on 15 July 1884
 Bad Wildungen–Buhlen on 1 February 1909
 Buhlen–Waldeck on 1 May 1911
 Waldeck–Korbach on 1 June 1912
 Korbach–Lelbach-Rhena on 30 May 1914
 Brilon Wald–Willingen on 12 October 1914
 Lelbach-Rhena–Eimelrod on 1 May 1916
 Eimelrod–Usseln on 14 August 1916
 Usseln–Willingen on 2 April 1917
 
Until about 1982, a Heckeneilzug ("hedge express"; a train that runs express in metropolitan areas, but stops at all stations in rural areas) ran between Korbach and Brilon as part of a route from Frankfurt to Bremerhaven (and to Hamburg for a time). A pair of express trains ran from Bad Wildungen to Amsterdam and back until 1991.
 
Traffic between Bergheim-Giflitz and Korbach was stopped on 27 May 1995 due to the need to renovate bridge structures. Subsequently, the line from Bad Wildungen via Bergheim-Giflitz to Hemfurth-Edersee was used for excursion traffic, using the E.ON connecting track to the Waldeck Pumped Storage Station running between Bergheim-Giflitz and Hemfurth-Edersee. Traffic was stopped again on 3 October 2001 due to the need to rehabilitate the line. Reactivation of the line is still under discussion.
 
Freight traffic between Korbach and Bad Wildungen was discontinued on 1 January 1992.

Current operations

Wabern–Bad Wildungen 

Service run every two on the section between Wabern and Bad Wildungen. There are deviations from this pattern in the morning peak hour. From 7 a.m. onwards, all trains run continuously to and from Kassel. From and to the south there are connections to the Regional-Express service between Kassel and Frankfurt am Main in Wabern. Since the timetable change in 2008/2009, the service has been operated by the Kurhessenbahn, which took over operations from the Hessische Landesbahn. Until December 2015, most of the trains ran only on the route between Wabern and Bad Wildungen, with a short wait between for a connection to Kassel in Wabern. The Waldeck-Frankenberg district and the town of Bad Wildungen support the new direct services with an annual operating subsidy.

Korbach–Brilon Wald 

A basic two-hour cycle operates on the section between Korbach and Brilon Wald. This is increased by additional trains in the morning and afternoon. Due to Willingen's touristic importance, a significantly denser train service is provided between Brilon Wald and Willingen from Friday to Sunday, with some services running to/from Hagen and Dortmund, offering further travel options.
 
The Uplandbahn between Korbach and Brilon Wald is particularly important for the development of the tourist and winter sports location of Willingen in the Waldeck Upland. Local passenger services are operated by the Kurhessenbahn. The average speed of the trains is around 53 km/h.
 

 
Both sections, which are still being used, have been threatened with closure several times in recent years. The line between Korbach and Willingen was temporarily out of order due to the dilapidation of Willingen Viaduct. The renovation of the four viaducts in Rhena, Bömighausen, Usseln and Willingen enabled the Kurhessenbahn to resume continuous operation. The maximum permissible speed has been increased to 100 km/h. Control of Usseln and Willingen stations was transferred to a ZSB2000 signal box built by Scheidt & Bachmann under a nationwide pilot project, with the train controller being based in Korbach. In the meantime, the Signalisierter Zugleitbetrieb operating procedure (a form of direct traffic control) was authorised and Korbach Hauptbahnhof was equipped with combination signals (Ks-Signalsystem). Since November 2009, the line has been remotely controlled by the train controller at Kassel Hauptbahnhof.  In 2015, as part of the line modernisation, the Untere Edertalbahn (Korbach–Frankenberg) section was restored. Since then the R 42 trains that run from Marburg have connected to Brilon Stadt.

Edersee Railway rail trail 

The 26.139 kilometre-long Edersee Railway rail trail (Ederseebahn-Radweg) on the Korbach–Buhlen section of the disused Edersee Railway was established from 2008 to 2012. This includes tunnels and bridges.

References

Footnotes

Sources
 
 

Railway lines in Hesse
Railway lines in North Rhine-Westphalia
Railway lines opened in 1884
1884 establishments in Germany
Buildings and structures in Hochsauerlandkreis
Buildings and structures in Waldeck-Frankenberg
Buildings and structures in Schwalm-Eder-Kreis